Clinton Jackson (born May 20, 1954) is an American former professional boxer. As an amateur, he competed in the 1976 Summer Olympics. He also won a silver medal at the 1974 World Championships and a gold at the 1975 Pan American Games.

Biography
Born in Evergreen, Alabama, Jackson was an all-around athlete who played football and basketball in high school. He began boxing in 1970 when he walked into a gym in Pensacola, Florida. He lost to Emilio Correa in the gold medal match at the 1974 World Championships, but then defeated him en route to a gold medal at the 1975 Pan American Games.

He turned professional in 1979 but never achieved the results that he had as an amateur. He failed to win a fight against any significant opposition, and lost decisions to James Shuler, Sumbu Kalambay, and Buster Drayton. Jackson retired after a knockout win in October 1985.

In 1989, Jackson, a former sheriff's deputy, was convicted of kidnapping an Alabama banker in an extortion scheme, in which he demanded US$9,000. In 1992, an Associated Press article reported that Jackson was serving a life sentence in an Alabama prison inmate #00154880. According to Sports Illustrated, he was still serving a life sentence as of January 2015.

Amateur highlights
1974 National AAU Welterweight Champion
1974 National Golden Gloves Welterweight Champion
1975 National AAU Welterweight Champion
1975 National Golden Gloves Welterweight Champion
1975 Pan American Games Welterweight Champion
1976 National AAU Welterweight Champion
1976 National Golden Gloves Welterweight Champion
1976 United States Olympic representative at Welterweight
1977 National AAU Light Middleweight champion
1978 National AAU Welterweight runner-up, losing to Roger Leonard.

1976 Olympic results
Below are the results of Clinton Jackson, an American welterweight boxer who competed at the 1976 Montreal Olympics:

 Round of 32: Defeated (5–0) Zbigniew Kicka of Poland
 Round of 16: Defeated (KO 1) Wesly Felix of Haiti
 Quarterfinal: Lost (2–3) to Pedro Gamarro of Venezuela

Clinton Jackson had 221 amateur fights, finishing his amateur career with a record of 206 wins 15 losses. He soon turned professional, but also coached the Nashville Sheriff's Dept. celebrated boxing team.

Professional record

|-
|align="center" colspan=8|25 Wins (19 knockouts, 6 decisions), 7 Losses (2 knockouts, 5 decisions) 
|-
| align="center" style="border-style: none none solid solid; background: #e3e3e3"|Result
| align="center" style="border-style: none none solid solid; background: #e3e3e3"|Record
| align="center" style="border-style: none none solid solid; background: #e3e3e3"|Opponent
| align="center" style="border-style: none none solid solid; background: #e3e3e3"|Type
| align="center" style="border-style: none none solid solid; background: #e3e3e3"|Round
| align="center" style="border-style: none none solid solid; background: #e3e3e3"|Date
| align="center" style="border-style: none none solid solid; background: #e3e3e3"|Location
| align="center" style="border-style: none none solid solid; background: #e3e3e3"|Notes
|-align=center
|Win
|
|align=left| Gary Jones
|KO
|3
|04/10/1985
|align=left| Kenosha, Wisconsin, U.S.
|align=left|
|-
|Loss
|
|align=left| Don Shiver
|UD
|10
|07/03/1985
|align=left| Egypt Shrine Temple, Tampa, Florida, U.S.
|align=left|
|-
|Win
|
|align=left| Johnny Heard
|TKO
|4
|16/02/1985
|align=left| VFW Hall, Dixon, Illinois, U.S.
|align=left|
|-
|Loss
|
|align=left| Sumbu Kalambay
|PTS
|8
|10/12/1984
|align=left| Palais Omnisports de Paris-Bercy, Bercy, France
|align=left|
|-
|Loss
|
|align=left| Sammy Floyd
|PTS
|8
|28/08/1984
|align=left| Birmingham, Alabama, U.S.
|align=left|
|-
|Loss
|
|align=left| James Shuler
|PTS
|12
|17/01/1984
|align=left| Pennsylvania Hall, Philadelphia, Pennsylvania, U.S.
|align=left|
|-
|Loss
|
|align=left| Buster Drayton
|TKO
|2
|12/05/1983
|align=left| Bristol, Tennessee, U.S.
|align=left|
|-
|Win
|
|align=left| Homer Jackson
|KO
|1
|09/12/1982
|align=left| Pensacola, Florida, U.S.
|align=left|
|-
|Win
|
|align=left| J.J. Cottrell
|KO
|10
|30/11/1982
|align=left| Showboat Hotel & Casino, Las Vegas, Nevada, U.S.
|align=left|
|-
|Win
|
|align=left| Wilbur Henderson
|UD
|10
|04/11/1982
|align=left| Sands Atlantic City, Atlantic City, New Jersey, U.S.
|align=left|
|-
|Win
|
|align=left| Robbie Sims
|PTS
|10
|16/10/1982
|align=left| Sands Atlantic City, Atlantic City, New Jersey, U.S.
|align=left|
|-
|Win
|
|align=left| James Coleman
|KO
|1
|25/07/1982
|align=left| Savannah, Georgia, U.S.
|align=left|
|-
|Loss
|
|align=left| Frank Fletcher
|UD
|12
|20/06/1982
|align=left| Sands Atlantic City, Atlantic City, New Jersey, U.S.
|align=left|
|-
|Win
|
|align=left| Al Clay
|KO
|1
|07/04/1982
|align=left| Nashville, Tennessee, U.S.
|align=left|
|-
|Win
|
|align=left| Willie Ray Taylor
|KO
|1
|26/03/1982
|align=left| Knoxville, Tennessee, U.S.
|align=left|
|-
|Win
|
|align=left| Clifford Wills
|KO
|4
|10/03/1982
|align=left| Nashville, Tennessee, U.S.
|align=left|
|-
|Win
|
|align=left| Mario Maldonado
|KO
|8
|17/12/1981
|align=left| Atlantic City, New Jersey, U.S.
|align=left|
|-
|Win
|
|align=left| Roosevelt Moss
|KO
|1
|27/11/1981
|align=left| Knoxville, Tennessee, U.S.
|align=left|
|-
|Win
|
|align=left| Bruce Thompson
|KO
|3
|21/11/1981
|align=left| Portland, Oregon, U.S.
|align=left|
|-
|Win
|
|align=left| Jerry Holly
|UD
|10
|27/10/1981
|align=left| Curtis Hixon Hall, Tampa, Florida, U.S.
|align=left|
|-
|Win
|
|align=left| Bruce Thompson
|UD
|10
|08/09/1981
|align=left| Curtis Hixon Hall, Tampa, Florida, U.S.
|align=left|
|-
|Loss
|
|align=left| Tony Braxton
|TKO
|9
|07/05/1981
|align=left| Playboy Hotel and Casino, Atlantic City, New Jersey, U.S.
|align=left|
|-
|Win
|
|align=left| Ken Heflin
|KO
|2
|15/02/1981
|align=left| Knoxville Civic Coliseum, Knoxville, Tennessee, U.S.
|align=left|
|-
|Win
|
|align=left| Mauricio Aldana
|KO
|7
|26/12/1980
|align=left| Caesars Palace, Paradise, Nevada, U.S.
|align=left|
|-
|Win
|
|align=left| Ray Hammond
|UD
|10
|01/08/1980
|align=left| Caesars Palace, Paradise, Nevada, U.S.
|align=left|
|-
|Win
|
|align=left| Zip Castillo
|KO
|3
|09/05/1980
|align=left| Tennessee State Fairgrounds arena, Nashville, Tennessee, U.S.
|align=left|
|-
|Win
|
|align=left| Jimmy Heair
|KO
|9
|31/03/1980
|align=left| Stokley Athletics Center, Knoxville, Tennessee, U.S.
|align=left|
|-
|Win
|
|align=left| James Knox
|KO
|1
|08/03/1980
|align=left| Nashville, Tennessee, U.S.
|align=left|
|-
|Win
|
|align=left| Larry Rayford
|KO
|7
|30/11/1979
|align=left| Louisiana Superdome, New Orleans, Louisiana, U.S.
|align=left|
|-
|Win
|
|align=left| Larry Martin
|KO
|2
|30/10/1979
|align=left| Memphis, Tennessee, U.S.
|align=left|
|-
|Win
|
|align=left| Jimmy Wallace
|KO
|2
|28/08/1979
|align=left| Memphis, Tennessee, U.S.
|align=left|
|-
|Win
|
|align=left| Rafael Corona
|PTS
|4
|03/08/1979
|align=left| Santa Monica Civic Auditorium, Santa Monica, California, U.S.
|align=left|
|}

References

External links
 

1954 births
Welterweight boxers
Middleweight boxers
Southpaw boxers
Living people
Boxers from Tennessee
Boxers at the 1976 Summer Olympics
Olympic boxers of the United States
Boxers at the 1975 Pan American Games
Pan American Games gold medalists for the United States
People from Evergreen, Alabama
Sportspeople from Nashville, Tennessee
National Golden Gloves champions
American male boxers
African-American boxers
Pan American Games medalists in boxing
American extortionists
American sportspeople convicted of crimes
American people convicted of kidnapping
American prisoners sentenced to life imprisonment
AIBA World Boxing Championships medalists
Medalists at the 1975 Pan American Games
20th-century American people